The 209 Al-Fatah Corps is one of the eight corps of the Islamic Emirate Army established in October 2021 and headquartered in Mazar-i-Sharif. The current Chief of Staff is Abdul Razzaq Faizullah.

The Islamic Republic of Afghanistan-era corps it replaced was known as the 209th 'Shaheen' Corps and was a part of Afghan National Army.

Commands

References

Military units and formations established in 2021
Corps of the Islamic Emirate Army